The Second De Geer cabinet, also called the First London cabinet, was the cabinet of the Netherlands from 10 August 1939 until 3 September 1940. The cabinet was formed by the political parties Roman Catholic State Party (RKSP), Social Democratic Workers' Party (SDAP), Anti-Revolutionary Party (ARP), Christian Historical Union (CHU) and the Free-thinking Democratic League (VDB) following the dismissal of the Fifth Colijn cabinet by Queen Wilhelmina on 27 July 1939. The national unity government became a War cabinet on 14 May 1940 following the German invasion and fled to London. The government-in-exile was dismissed by Queen Wilhelmina on 26 August 1940.

Term
The cabinet fell on 26 August 1940 after a conflict between Queen Wilhelmina and Prime Minister Dirk Jan de Geer; the cabinet continued for one week as a demissionary cabinet until the First Gerbrandy cabinet was installed on 3 September 1940.

Cabinet members

 Retained this position from the previous cabinet.

References

External links
Official

  Kabinet-De Geer II Parlement & Politiek

Cabinets of the Netherlands
1939 establishments in the Netherlands
1940 disestablishments in the Netherlands
Cabinets established in 1939
Cabinets disestablished in 1940
Netherlands in World War II
Governments in exile during World War II